The Aubrey R. Watzek House is a historic house at 1061 SW Skyline Boulevard in Portland, Oregon, United States.  Built in 1936–1937 for a lumber magnate, it was considered a major regional statement of Modern architecture not long after its completion. It was designated a National Historic Landmark on July 25, 2011.  It is now part of the University of Oregon's John Yeon Center for Architecture, and is used as a special event facility.

Description and history
The Aubrey R. Watzek House is located in Portland's west side Sylvan-Highlands neighborhood, in a bend of SW Skyline Boulevard between SW Barnes Road and SW Fairview Boulevard.  The property affords expansive views to the north, east, and south, including views of Mount Hood.  The house is a single-story gable-roofed wood-frame structure, with a U-shaped configuration around a central courtyard.  It presents a deceptively modest entrance area to the arriving visitor, with the main entrance set in an otherwise blank wall.  The entry opens to the courtyard, which is a garden space with a small pool, and then into a narrow hall from which the rest of the house is gradually revealed.  The living room and dining room are sited to provide maximum exposure to the views.

Aubrey Watzek was a lumber magnate, who commissioned John Yeon, then a young architect, to design a house for himself and his mother.  Yeon completed the design in 1936, but Watzek initially rejected it.  After working for a time with another architect at A.E. Doyle, he accepted Yeon's design.  The house was completed in 1937.  Watzek lived in the house until his death in January 1973.

The house received immediate notice after its construction, and was included in an architectural exhibition organized by the Museum of Modern Art.  Yeon purchased the house after Watzek's death, and it was subsequently taken over by the University of Oregon.  It is open for group tours, day meetings, and other special events.

See also
List of National Historic Landmarks in Oregon
National Register of Historic Places listings in Southwest Portland, Oregon

References

External links

Historic images of the Watzek House from the University of Oregon digital collections
Aubrey Richardson Watzek House from the University of Washington Pacific Coast Architecture Database
Summer at the Watzek House an exploration of ongoing historic preservation at the Watzek House

Houses completed in 1936
John Yeon buildings
University of Oregon
Modernist architecture in Oregon
National Historic Landmarks in Oregon
Houses on the National Register of Historic Places in Portland, Oregon
1936 establishments in Oregon
Southwest Portland, Oregon
Portland Historic Landmarks